The Johnny Rockets Group Inc. is an American restaurant franchise whose themed decor is based upon 1950s diner-style restaurants. Décor includes Coca-Cola advertising, featuring nearly life-size cardboard illustrations of women in World War II armed services uniforms (see WASP- Women Airforce Service Pilots), individual jukebox stations, chrome accents and red vinyl seats.

The menu, presentation, counter seating and grilling area are based on an original restaurant from 1947 (still operating today), The Apple Pan in West Los Angeles. Hamburgers are grilled-to-order in full view of the customers and are served wrapped in paper in metal baskets. One location in Hawaii is called "Rock 'n Fun" and also has an arcade.

History
Johnny Rockets was founded on June 6, 1986, by Ronn Teitelbaum of Los Angeles, California, and "crafted as a 'nongimmicky' recreation of the 1940s-vintage malt shops of his childhood". The first restaurant was established as a 20-stool counter operation on Melrose Avenue in Los Angeles. This location permanently closed on October 26, 2015. Ronn Teitelbaum died on September 11, 2000, at age 61.

In February 2007, it was announced that RedZone Capital, the private equity firm of Daniel Snyder, was set to acquire the chain. Snyder announced plans to expand the chain both within the United States and worldwide, including the launch of smaller outlets known as Johnny Rockets Express. Snyder recruited industry veteran Lee Sanders from Buffalo Wild Wings, formerly with Dunkin Brands, General Mills, and Pepsico, to serve as president and CEO, and board member.  Sanders ran the business for almost 4 years.

A sit-down restaurant owned by Six Flags Over Texas (Red Zone was the largest shareholder at the time), Trappers Adirondack Grill, was converted to a Johnny Rockets in June 2008. A few years later Six Flags New England would also get a Johnny Rocket's near the Superman: Ride Of Steel.

In April 2009, the new Yankee Stadium opened with Johnny Rockets stands throughout the site. These stands serve traditional Johnny Rockets hamburgers, french fries, shakes, and malts, among other menu items. FedExField, home of the Washington Commanders (the stadium and team are both owned by Snyder, whose company owned Johnny Rockets at the time), features Johnny Rockets concession areas.

The world's largest Johnny Rockets franchise opened on June 6, 2012, at the corner of Abraham Lincoln Avenue and Bolivar Avenue in Santo Domingo, the capital city of the Dominican Republic.

In 2013, RedZone Capital Management sold the company to Sun Capital Partners.

On August 13, 2020, Johnny Rockets was acquired by FAT Brands (parent company of Fatburger) for $25 million.

International 
Johnny Rockets operates restaurants in Australia, Bahrain, Bolivia, Brazil, Canada, Chile, Costa Rica, Ecuador, Honduras, India, Indonesia, Italy, Kuwait, Mexico, Nigeria, Northern Cyprus, Norway, Oman, Pakistan, Panama, Paraguay, Peru, Philippines, Poland, Qatar, Saudi Arabia, South Korea, Spain, Tunisia, United Arab Emirates and Uruguay.

The first Johnny Rockets restaurant in Pakistan was opened in 2013 in Karachi. and later in Lahore and Islamabad in 2014. Johnny Rockets opened their first outlet in Bangladesh at Uttara of Dhaka in November 2016, but later left the country in 2020. Johnny Rockets opened its first branch in Paraguay on December 16, 2016, in Shopping Mariscal, Asuncion. In 2016, they also opened branches in Peru and Bolivia.

The first European Johnny Rockets restaurant was opened in Italy, precisely in Brescia, on September 22, 2016, in Elnos Shopping Center.

Johnny Rockets Canada had five Canadian locations, two Located in Victoria, British Columbia, two located in Vancouver, British Columbia, and one in Windsor, Ontario., but closed them down in 2022 

Several Royal Caribbean International cruise ships have Johnny Rockets restaurants operating on board.

In popular culture

It was mentioned in the song "Westside Story" by 90s pop boyband LFO by member the late Rich Cronin's rap verse off their
debut self-titled album in 1999.

In 2009, the company and CEO John Fuller was featured in the hit TV show Undercover Boss on CBS in the US and on Channel 4 in the United Kingdom.

The sixth episode of the anime series Blood Blockade Battlefront features a parody of the restaurant called "Jack & Rockets" which the characters Leonardo Watch and Nej order from a lot.

The action/comedy series Wrestlicious featured comedy sketches with "50s Girl Shauna Na" which were filmed at Johnny Rockets in downtown Tampa Florida.

An American black comedy crime drama thriller series Barry alluded to Johnny Rockets in LA during episode 3 of season 3.

The rock and roll and metal inspired and anime styled fighting video game series Guilty Gear features a parody of the restaurant by the name of Danny Missiles, which has survived into the near end of the 22nd Century and is frequented by the cast.

See also

 Eddie Rocket's
 Ed's Easy Diner
 List of hamburger restaurants

References

External links

 

1986 establishments in California
Fast-food chains of the United States
Hamburger restaurants in the United States
Nostalgia in the United States
Restaurant chains in the United States
Restaurant franchises
Restaurants established in 1986
Restaurants in Greater Los Angeles
Theme restaurants
2007 mergers and acquisitions
2013 mergers and acquisitions
2020 mergers and acquisitions
Retro style
Companies based in Hampden County, Massachusetts